Kriebstein Castle is a castle in Kriebstein near the town of Waldheim in the German state of Saxony.

Location 
The castle rises above steep crags over the River Zschopau. Within the topographical grouping of hill castles it is classified as a spur castle because it lies on the extreme end of a hill spur surrounded on three sides by the Zschopau that flows around the spur in a large bow.

Layout 
The rock on which the castle stands is separated from rising ground behind it by a man-made section of ditch, the so-called Halsgraben. Typologically the Kriebstein is a combination of a tower castle (Turmburg) and a ringwork castle (Ringburg) with an oval ground plan. Dominating the whole site is the monumental keep perched atop the highest crag. With its sides measuring 22 x 12 metres, the tower, including its weather vane, reaches a height of 45 metres. Its late medieval oriel turrets and the flèche give the castle a unique and thus unmistakable silhouette. Around the keep are grouped the tower-shaped gatehouse, the curtain wall with its domestic wing, the kitchen and other buildings including the chapel wing. On the east side of the chapel wing is the double-bay, cross-ribbed vaulted Gothic hall and the rear of the castle. This building complex, immediately above the steep slopes over the Zschopau river, has a continuous upper storey dating to the 17th century. The Late Gothic kitchen building is attached directly to the keep at the centre of the castle. The whole is enclosed by a domestic wing, that was used as a great hall (today as a concert and event chamber; weddings also take place at the castle) and contained the well house as well as the northern defensive wall that joined onto the gatehouse.

References 
 First record of Kriebstein Castle dating to 4 October 1384, Original in the Dresden Main State Archive (Hauptstaatsarchiv Dresden), FinanzArchivurkunde No. 44/65.

Sources 
 Cornelius Gurlitt: Beschreibende Darstellung der älteren Bau- und Kunstdenkmäler des Kgr. Sachsen. Heft 25. Ah. Döbeln, Dresden 1903, pp. 87–104.
 Otto Eduard Schmidt: Burg Kriebstein – Ein Denkmal mitteldeutscher Geschichte und Kultur. In: Mitteilungen des Landesvereins Sächsischer Heimatschutz. Band 23, Heft 9–12, 1934, pp. 193–232.
 Otto Eduard Schmidt: Die mittelalterlichen Fresken der Burgkapelle zu Kriebstein. In: Mitteilungen des Landesvereins Sächsischer Heimatschutz. Band 27, Heft 1–4, 1938, pp. 43–51.
 Jochen Pfob: Wie alt ist Burg Kriebstein tatsächlich? In: Erzgebirgische Heimatblätter. No. 3, 1980, pp. 64–65.
 Wolfgang Schwabenickv: Die hochmittelalterliche Wehranlage "Waal" in Beerwalde, Kr. Hainichen. In: Arbeits- und Forschungsberichte zur sächsischen Bodendenkmalpflege. Heft 24/25. Berlin 1982, pp. 311–382.
 Bernd Wippert: Zur Baugeschichte der Burg Kriebstein. In: Mitteilungen des Landesvereins Sächsischer Heimatschutz e. V. Nr. 2, 1993, pp. 11–15.
 Peter Petersen: Dendrochronologische Untersuchungen auf der Burg Kriebstein/Sachsen. In: Forschungen zu Burgen und Schlössern. Band 1. Wartburg-Gesellschaft, München, Berlin 1994, pp. 95–103.
 Bernd Wippert: Ein „vergessenes“ Gewölbe - zu neuem Leben erweckt. Das Schatzgewölbe auf Burg Kriebstein. In: Sächsische Schlösserverwaltung (Hrsg.): Jahrbuch 1995 der Staatlichen Schlösser, Burgen und Gärten in Sachsen. Dresden o. J., pp. 179–183.
 Wolfgang Schwabenickv: Die Anfänge der Burg und Herrschaft Kriebstein; in: Schwabenickv, Wolfgang (Hrsg.): Archäologie und Baugeschichte – Forschungsberichte aus dem Landkreis Hainichen, Mittweida 1994, pp. 5–16.
 Bernd Wippert, Gabriele Wippert: Burg Kriebstein (= DKV-Kunstführer. Nr. 548). München, Berlin (2000).
 Bernd Wippert: Das Kriebsteinzimmer auf Burg Kriebstein. In: Sächsische Schlösserverwaltung im Landesamt für Finanzen (Hrsg.): Jahrbuch der Staatlichen Schlösser, Burgen und Gärten in Sachsen. Band 7. Dresden 2001, pp. 30–37.
 Peter Petersen, Bernd Wippert: Burg Kriebstein. Ein Architekturführer. Leipzig 2004, .
 Peter Petersen, Bernd Wippert: Burg Kriebstein. Vom Wandel niederadliger Wohnvorstellungen im 15. Jahrhundert. In: Burgenbau im späten Mittelalter II (= Forschungen zu Burgen und Schlössern. Band 12). Wartburg-Gesellschaft, München, Berlin 2009, pp. 79–94.
 Annette Binninger: Der Schatz von Kriebstein kehrt heim nach Ostpreußen. In: Sächsische Zeitung. Ausgabe vom 13./14. February 2010.

External links 

 Website of Kriebstein Castle
 Old and new perspectives of Kriebstein Castle
 Dresden-Bilder.de - Kriebstein Castle
 Burg Kriebstein auf der Seite dickemauern.de
 Ehrenberg Castle - high above the River Zschopau, immediately opposite Kriebstein Castle

Castles in Saxony
Rock castles
Buildings and structures in Mittelsachsen